This is a list of members of the South Australian House of Assembly from 1921 to 1924, as elected at the 1921 state election:

 The parliamentary wing of the Farmers and Settlers Association had been referred to by a variety of labels prior to this term of parliament, and had contested the 1921 election independently of the National-dominated "Progressive Country Party". After the 1921 election, the party formally adopted the "Country Party" name, consistent with their federal counterparts.
 Alexandra Liberal MHA George Ritchie resigned on 2 November 1922. Liberal candidate Percy Heggaton won the resulting by-election on 20 January 1923.
 The Liberal Union and the National Party merged in October 1923 to form the Liberal Federation.

Members of South Australian parliaments by term
20th-century Australian politicians